Acrobasis suavella, the thicket knot-horn, is a moth of the family Pyralidae. It was described by Johann Leopold Theodor Friedrich Zincken in 1818 and is found in Europe.

The wingspan is 19–24 mm. The moth flies in one generation from June to September.

The caterpillars preferably feed on blackthorn.

Notes
The flight season refers to Belgium and the Netherlands. This may vary in other parts of the range.

References

External links
 waarneming.nl 
 Lepidoptera of Belgium
 Trachycera suavella on UKMoths

Moths described in 1818
Acrobasis
Moths of Europe